Post-theism is the belief that the belief in a god belongs to a previous stage of human development and, thus, a division of theism vs. atheism is obsolete. It is a variant of nontheism. The term appears in liberal Christianity and post-Christianity.

Origin
Frank Hugh Foster in a 1918 lecture announced that modern culture had arrived at a "post-theistic stage" in which humanity has taken possession of the powers of agency and creativity that had formerly been projected upon God.

Denys Turner argues that Karl Marx did not choose atheism over theism but rejected the binary Feuerbachian choice in The Essence of Christianity altogether, a position which by being post-theistic is at the same time necessarily post-atheistic. At one point, Marx argued "there should be less trifling with the label 'atheism'", as he insisted "religion in itself is without content, it owes its being not to heaven but to the earth, and with the abolition of distorted reality, of which it is the theory, it will collapse of itself."

Related ideas include Friedrich Nietzsche's pronouncement that "God is dead" and the transtheism of Paul Tillich or Pema Chödrön.

Notable post-theists

Karl Marx
Friedrich Nietzsche
Sigmund Freud

See also

Apatheism
Humanism
Postmodern Christianity
Samkhya
Transtheism
Universalism
Virtuous pagan

Notes and references

Sources
 H. J. Adriannse, "After Theism" in: H. A. Krop, Arie L. Molendijk, Hent de Vries (eds.) Post-Theism: Reframing the Judeo-Christian Tradition (2000), .
 Christoph Schwöbel, "After Post-Theism" in: S. Andersen (ed. ) Traditional Theism and its Modern Alternatives (1994), 161–196.
 Vincent Brümmer, "The Enlightenment Project and the Human Image of God" in: Hans-Georg Ziebertz (ed.), The Human Image of God, BRILL, 2001, 55–72.

External links
Post-colonialism and Post-theism by Christopher Bradley  (2007)
Entry on "Atheism" at Marxists Internet Archive: Encyclopedia of Marxism
Post-Atheism: from Apophatic Theology to "Minimal Religion" by Mikhail Epstein In the book: Russian Postmodernism: New Perspectives on Post-Soviet Culture (with Alexander Genis and Slobodanka Vladiv-Glover, in the series Studies in Slavic Literature, Culture, and Society, vol. 3). New York, Oxford: Berghahn Books, 1999, 528 pp.345-393.

Nontheism
Theism
Postmodernism
Humanism
Philosophy of religion